The 2018–19 AC Sparta Prague season was the club's 124th season in existence and the 26th consecutive season in the top flight of Czech football. In addition to the domestic league, AC Sparta Prague participated in this season's editions of the Czech Cup and the UEFA Europa League. The season covered the period from 1 July 2018 to 30 June 2019.

Manager Pavel Hapal was fired on 27 July 2018, a day after loss against FK Spartak Subotica in first leg of UEFA Europa League's Second qualifying round. He was temporary replaced by Zdeněk Ščasný, Sparta's sports director.

Squad 
Squad at end of season

Out on loan

Pre-season and friendlies

Competitions

Overview

Czech First League

Regular season

League table

Results summary

Results by round

Matches

Championship group

League table

Results summary

Results by round

Matches

Czech Cup

UEFA Europa League

Qualifying rounds

Second qualifying round

Statistics

Goals

Assists

Yellow cards

Red cards

References 

AC Sparta Prague seasons
Sparta Prague
Sparta Prague